Cody Blue Snider (born December 7, 1989) is an American director and screenwriter best known for his short film "Fool's Day" which premiered at the Tribeca Film Festival in 2013. His body of work spans from music videos and commercials to film and television.

Early life 
Cody Blue Snider was born in Queens, New York to Dee Snider, frontman of Twisted Sister, and costume designer Suzette Snider. He was raised in East Setauket, New York, and graduated from Ward Melville High School in 2007. Upon graduation, Snider enrolled in the School of Visual Arts to study film production.

Career 
After one semester, Snider decided to leave the university to pursue a career in film. Snider got a position as a director's assistant to Adam Green and worked on the 2010 film Frozen. Once production was complete, Snider used the money from what would have been his second semester of film school to direct his own short film All That Remains.[ The film garnered critical acclaim, allowing Snider to break into music videos and commercials.  Cody also acted in the Adam Green produced film Hatchet III.

Snider premiered his most recent short film "Fool's Day" in 2013. The film amassed over forty awards internationally, including the Academy Award qualifying Palm Springs, Austin, and Seattle International Film Festivals. Vice News spoke highly of the film and of Snider's work, saying, "Snider's subject matter--exploding heads, death, drugs, blood, and rejecting authority ... Here's to hoping we get more from Snider, preferably as soon as possible." Additionally, "Fool's Day" was voted number one on The Hollywood Reporter's Viewfinder list in 2013.

Currently, Snider resides in Los Angeles, California where he is developing multiple projects for film, commercials, and television. He is working with New Line Cinema to adapt "Fool's Day" into a feature film with Edward Norton attached to produce.

In 2022, Snider started a podcast called, "Awakened Underground," under Cavalry Audio productions. The podcast goes over plant based medicines and modalities that he discovered on his journey to find health.

References

American male screenwriters
American film directors
1989 births
Living people
Ward Melville High School alumni